The Awful Spook is a silent short animated film created by the Bray Studio, featuring Krazy Kat.

Plot
Krazy is sitting on the slope of a hill until he is approached and greeted by a husky carrying a bowling ball. The husky asks Krazy to deliver the bowling ball to a terrier who is the husky's friend. The husky also tells Krazy that the terrier will pay him 5 cents for the delivery. Krazy accepts the request, and takes the ball.

On his journey to delivering to the terrier, Krazy carries the bowling ball on his head. While still on the slope, Krazy walks by a tree with a spider web on the branch. When the spider lowers right in front of his face, Krazy is startled and drops the ball which begins rolling away. The bowling ball rolls toward a pond where it breaks down a vertical log where a mongoose is sitting on. Both the mongoose and the ball drop into the pond as a result. When the bowling ball and the mongoose surface from the water, the mongoose mistakes the ball for a monster, and frantically runs away. Momentarily, Krazy arrives at the pond to retrieve the bowling ball.

The scene shifts to the mongoose who is in another place outdoors, standing in front of a picket fence. Just then, Krazy, with the bowling ball on top, comes by the other side of the fence. Because the fence is as tall as the cat, and the bowling ball is sticking above, the mongoose notices this and thought what he thinks is a monster is after him. Once more the mongoose resumes running.

The mongoose comes to the terrier's home to tell the resident about something scary going on. But the terrier calmly tells him that there is no such thing around. Moments later, Krazy also arrives. Krazy finally hands the bowling ball to the terrier who in turn pays the cat as promised. Ultimately realizing that his monster is merely the ball, the mongoose is annoyed and heads to the back of the terrier's home to plot something devious. The mongoose finds a block of granite, and aims to throw it at Krazy. But before he could do so, an overweight security guard notices, confronts, and asks him if he intends to do anything malicious with the block. Although the mongoose denies the suspicion, the guard confiscates the block, and tosses it upwards. But the airborne block still finds it way onto Krazy's head, knocking the cat off balance. Krazy even hallucinates, seeing a wallaby with wings.

Reception
Some scholars consider the Bray Krazy short films, such as this one, as the most faithful to the character.

Home media
In the 1970s, the short film was released in home film reels under the erroneous series name Kitty Kat.

The short film was also released in 2004 in a DVD video compilation called George Herriman's Kinomatic Krazy Kat Kartoon Klassics.

References

External links
The Awful Spook at the Big Cartoon Database

1921 films
1921 animated films
1921 short films
1920s American animated films
1920s animated short films
American black-and-white films
American silent short films
Animated sports films
Krazy Kat shorts
American animated short films
Bray Productions films